The Banana Doughnut theory - also sometimes known as Born-Fréchet kernel theory, or Finite-frequency theory - is a model in seismic tomography that describes the shape of the Fresnel zone along the entire ray path of a body wave. This theory suggests that the area that influences the ray velocity is the surrounding material and not the infinitesimally small ray path. This surrounding material forms a tube enclosing the ray, but does not incorporate the ray path itself.

The name was coined by Princeton University postdoc Henk Marquering.  This theory gets the name "banana" because the tube of influence along the entire ray path from source to receiver is an arc resembling the fruit. The "doughnut" part of the name comes from the ring shape of the cross-section. The ray path is a hollow banana, or a banana-shaped doughnut.

References

Seismology measurement